The men's ice hockey tournament at the 1960 Winter Olympics in Squaw Valley, United States, was the ninth Olympic Championship, also serving as the 27th World Championships and the 38th European Championships.  The United States won its first Olympic gold medal and second World Championship.  Canada, represented for the second time by the Kitchener-Waterloo Dutchmen, won the silver and Canada's ninth consecutive Olympic ice hockey medal (a feat not matched until the Soviet Union won its ninth consecutive medal in 1988). The Soviet Union (the highest finishing European team) won the bronze medal and its sixth European Championship.  The tournament was held at the Blyth Arena, under the supervision of George Dudley on behalf of the International Ice Hockey Federation.

Canada, the Soviet Union, Czechoslovakia and Sweden were the top four teams heading into the Games. All four were defeated by the American team, which won all seven games it played. On the 50th anniversary of these Games, a documentary entitled Forgotten Miracle was produced by Northland Films, making reference to the more famous 1980 gold medal known as the Miracle on Ice; these are the only two Olympic gold medals won by USA men's ice hockey. Herb Brooks, the coach of the 1980 US team, was the last player cut from the 1960 team by coach Jack Riley.

This was the first and last time Australia participated in an Olympic men's ice hockey tournament.

Medalists

Qualification 
The two German teams played a qualification round to determine which team would participate at the Olympics. West Germany won both games.

First round 
Top two teams (shaded ones) from each group advanced to the final round and played for 1st-6th places, other teams played in the consolation round.

Group A

Group B

Group C

Consolation round 
Teams that didn't qualify for the final round played here.  Sources differ on which Finland-Japan game took place on the 23rd, and which game took place on the 26th.

Final round 

First place team wins gold, second silver and third bronze.

Statistics

Average age
Team Australia was the oldest team in the tournament, averaging 28 years and 5 months. Team Finland was the youngest team in the tournament, averaging 23 years and 11 months. Gold medalists Team USA averaged 24 years and 6 months. Tournament average was 25 years and 7 months.

Leading scorers
Statistics:

Tournament awards
 Best players selected by the directorate:
 Best Goaltender:  Jack McCartan
 Best Defenceman:  Nikolai Sologubov
 Best Forward:  Nisse Nilsson

Final ranking

European Championship final ranking

References

External links
Jeux Olympiques 1960

Official games report
Summary and rosters

 
Ice
Ice hockey at the Winter Olympics
Olympics, Winter
IIHF Men's World Ice Hockey Championships
International ice hockey competitions hosted by the United States
Oly